The 27th Parliament of the Turkish Republic was elected in a snap general election held on 24 June 2018 to the Grand National Assembly. It succeeded the 26th Parliament of Turkey in July 2018 and is due to last until the latter half of 2022. The 600 members, elected through proportional representation from 87 electoral districts of Turkey, are shown in the table below.

Current structure 
Some deputies entered the election from the list of other parties with which their party formed electoral alliances. Democratic Party president Gültekin Uysal was in the list of İyi Parti for Afyonkarahisar, Great Unity Party president Mustafa Destici in Justice and Development Party's for Ankara (I), Nazır Cihangir İslam and Abdulkadir Karaduman of Felicity Party for Republican People's Party in İstanbul (III) and Konya respectively. Following the election, these deputies rejoined their original parties.

Mevlüt Çavuşoğlu, Süleyman Soylu, Berat Albayrak and Abdulhamit Gül were appointed as ministers, and consequently resigned to take these positions as the current Turkish constitution does not allow MPs to also be ministers.

In June 2020, with Leyla Güven and Musa Farisoğulları from the Peoples' Democratic Party (HDP) and Enis Berberoğlu from the Republican People's Party (CHP) three Parliamentarians were dismissed from office and arrested. Berberoğlu was later readmitted to parliament in February 2021. On the 17 March 2021 Ömer Faruk Gergerioğlu of the HDP was also stripped of his parliamentary immunity and dismissed from office. Yakup Taş of AKP was killed on 6 February 2023, during the 2023 Turkey–Syria earthquakes.

Members

References

Turkey
Terms of the Grand National Assembly of Turkey
2018 Turkish general election

2018 in Turkish politics
Political history of Turkey
Grand National Assembly of Turkey